Season of Doubt is a 1968 novel written by Australian author Jon Cleary set in Beirut. Cleary and his wife researched the novel by traveling extensively through the city.

In August 1966 Cleary said he had sold the film rights to Mark Robson, who had also bought The Long Pursuit; at that stage the novel was called Remember Jack Hoxie - but Cleary renamed it and used the Hoxie title on another novel.

References

External links
Season of Doubt at AustLit (subscription required)

Novels set in Lebanon
1968 Australian novels
Novels by Jon Cleary
William Collins, Sons books
William Morrow and Company books